Central Jail Gujranwala is an ancient Jail  situated in Gujranwala, Pakistan.

Prison industries

The prison industries at this jail were burnt to ashes during riot in 1992. Since then, no prison industry is functioning at the jail.

See also
 Government of Punjab, Pakistan
 Punjab Prisons (Pakistan)
 Prison Officer
 Headquarter Jail
 National Academy for Prisons Administration
 Punjab Prisons Staff Training Institute

References

External links
 Official Website of Punjab Prisons (Pakistan)

Prisons in Pakistan